West Liberty Presbyterian Church, also known as West Liberty Federated Church, was a historic Presbyterian church located at West Liberty, Ohio County, West Virginia, US. It was built in 1873 to a design by Wheeling architect Stanton M. Howard.  It was a simple rectangle in form with a projecting vestibule, in the Late Victorian Gothic style.  It was constructed of brick and stone, with steeply pitched roofs, parapet gables, and an open belfry.  The church was active in founding West Liberty Academy in 1838, which is now West Liberty University.

It was listed on the National Register of Historic Places in 1980. It has since been demolished, and the site redeveloped as a small park.

References

Churches on the National Register of Historic Places in West Virginia
Gothic Revival church buildings in West Virginia
Churches completed in 1873
Buildings and structures in Ohio County, West Virginia
National Register of Historic Places in Ohio County, West Virginia